Saint Peter and Saint Paul is a circa 1616 Catholic Baroque painting by the Spanish-born Neapolitan artist Jusepe de Ribera. It is on display in the Musée des Beaux-Arts of Strasbourg, France. Its inventory number is 180.

The painting bears a long and explicit signature on the edge of the table: JOSEPHUS RIBERA HISPANUS VALENTINUS CIVITATIS SETABIS ACADEMICUS ROMANUS; i.e. "José Ribera, a Spaniard from the Kingdom of Valencia, the city of Xàtiva, the Academy of Rome". Saint Peter and Saint Paul is influenced by Caravaggism in its naturalistic depiction of the two men, while displaying early Classicism in its solid composition. Ribera reused another canvas to paint over; an upside-down head of a child can still be seen below the parchment in Saint Peter's hand.

References

External links 

Saint Pierre et saint Paul , presentation on the museum's website

Paintings by Jusepe de Ribera
1616 paintings
Paintings in the collection of the Musée des Beaux-Arts de Strasbourg
Paintings depicting Saints Peter and Paul
Books in art